Nugent is a surname.

Those bearing it include:

Arts and entertainment
 Beth Nugent (born c.1958), American writer and academic
 Edward J. Nugent (1904–1995), American actor
 Elliott Nugent (1896–1980), American filmmaker
 Jay Nugent  (born 1972), American musician
 Jim Jefferies (comedian) (born 1977), real name Geoff Nugent, Australian comedian.
 Nelle Nugent (born 1939), American theater producer
 Richard Bruce Nugent (1906–1987), American writer
 Rodney Nugent (born 1957), American actor & writer
 Ted Nugent (born 1948), American musician

Military
 Sir George Nugent, 1st Baronet (1757–1849), British soldier & colonial governor 
 Laval Nugent von Westmeath (1777–1862), Irish-born Austrian soldier
 Richard E. Nugent (1902–1979), USAF general
 Robert Nugent (officer) Irish-American infantry officer

Politics
 James E. Nugent (born 1922), American politician
 John Nugent (journalist) (1821–1880), American; also quasi-diplomat
 John F. Nugent (1868–1931), American politician
 Kieran Nugent (1958–2000), Northern Ireland activist
 Peter Nugent (1938–2001), Australian politician
 Rich Nugent (born 1951), American politician and sheriff
 Richard Nugent, Baron Nugent of Guildford (1907–1994), British politician
 Robert Nugent, 1st Earl Nugent (1709–1788), Irish politician and poet

Science
 Carrie Nugent (born 1984), American physicist & science communicator
 Daniel Nugent (1954-1997), American anthropologist 
 Keith Nugent (born 1959), Australian physicist

Sport

Association football
 Cliff Nugent (born 1929), English footballer
 David Nugent (born 1985), British footballer
 John Nugent (footballer) (fl. 1904), British
 Kevin Nugent (footballer) (born 1969), English footballer
 Mike Nugent (soccer) (born 1980), American soccer player

Other sports
 Andrea Nugent (born 1968), Canadian swimmer
 Bob Nugent (1915–1995), American basketball player
 Kevin Nugent (ice hockey) (born 1955), American ice hockey play
 Michael Nugent (Australian footballer) (born 1959), Australian rules footballer
 Mike Nugent (born 1982), American football placekicker
 Mike Nugent (athlete) (born c.1945), Australian Paralympian
 Tom Nugent (1913–2006), American football coach

Other
 James Nugent (priest) (1822–1905), British religious leader
 Michael Nugent (born 1961), Irish writer, advocate of atheism
 Patrick John Nugent (born 1943), first husband of Luci Baines Johnson
 Robert Nugent (priest) (1937-2014), American Roman-Catholic priest and co-founder of New Ways Ministry
 William Nugent (soldier) (died 1690), Irish soldier

de:Nugent
fr:Nugent
it:Nugent (disambigua)